Nazarovo is a village in Rybinsky District of Yaroslavl Oblast, Russia.

Rural localities in Yaroslavl Oblast